Irumbu Manithan is a 2020 Tamil language film directed by Disney and starring Santhosh Prathap and Archana in the lead roles.

Cast  
Santhosh Prathap as Sundaram
 Archana as Thenmozhi
 Ganja Karuppu as Munikannu
 Madhusudhan Rao as Madhusoodhanan
 Nishanth
 Anitha Sampath as herself (news reporter)
 'Poraali' Dileepan

Production 
Director Disney began working on a film that will take place in several time periods. This was the second film of Disney who earlier directed Naan Sivanagiren (2011) under the name Gnanasekar. Archana, who was a part of Disney's unreleased Kuttram Purinthal, is a part of this film. Santhosh Prathap, Ganja Karuppu, and Madhusudhan Rao sport several looks in the film.

Soundtrack  
Songs for the film were composed by K. S. Manoj. Simbu edited and sang the folk song "Don't Worry Pullingo". The songs are written by Disney, Mohan Rajan, and Niranjan Bharathi.
Don't Worry Pullingo - Simbu
Vaazhvo Oru Vaanavil - Sathyaprakash D 
Katthaadi Parakkavitta - Mookkuthi Murugan 
Pachaikili Parappathupola - Ranjith

Release 
The film was released on 28 February 2020. The Times of India gave the film 1.5 stars out of five stars and criticized Sundaram's character arc while praising Ganja Karuppu's portrayal of Friday. Dina Thanthi praised the acting, direction, and story. Maalaimalar praised the film as a whole.

References

External links 
 

2020 films
2020s Tamil-language films
Indian drama films